Nupe (also known as Anufe, Nupenci, Nyinfe, Tapa) is a Volta–Niger language of the Nupoid branch primarily spoken by the Nupe people of the North Central region of Nigeria. Its geographical distribution stretches and maintains pre-eminence in Niger State as well as Kwara, Kogi, Nasarawa and the Federal Capital Territory.

Demographics
Nupe is the language spoken by the Nupe people, who reside mainly in Niger State in Nigeria, occupying a lowland of about 6,950 square miles (18,000 square kilometers) in the Niger Basin, mostly north of the river between the Kontagora and Guara confluents from Kainji to below Baro, and also Kwara State, Kogi State and the Federal Capital Territory.

Nupe is spoken mainly in Bida, Niger State and surrounding areas. It is also spoken in villages on the Benue River near Ibi and east of Lafia. Nupe has assimilated earlier ethnolinguistic groups such as the Benu of Kutigi (originally Kanuri-speaking), and the Gbagyi at Lemu.

Nupe-Tako (meaning ‘The Nupe Below’; also known as Bassa Nge) is spoken by the Bassa Nge people who also speak the Bassa Nge or Bassa Nupe dialect of the Basa language and is lexically most closely related to central Nupe.

Classification
The Nupe language belongs to the Nupoid branch of the Benue-Congo group of languages. Other languages in the group are Igbira (Ebira), Gade, and Kakanda. Nupe is related most closely to Kakanda in structure and vocabulary. There are at least two markedly different dialects: Nupe central and Nupe Tako.

Phonetics  
Nupe has 5 vowels: /a, e, i, o, u/. /a, i, u/ have nasalized forms.

Proverbs 
Common sayings come in the forms of egankogi (parable), gangba (warning), egancin (idiom), ecingi (riddle/tales) and eganmagan (proverb).

Eganmagan (proverb, plural eganmaganzhi) are wise sayings spoken among the Nupes. They are didactic proverbs which educate, entertain, and teach morality. They form part of the oral culture on norms and ethics of Nupe societies, and are passed from one generation to another through songs, stories, fables, folk tales, myths, legends, incantations, communal discussions, and worship.

Similar to other African proverbs, Nupe proverbs associate or relate people's action to their immediate environment in order to explain or correct particular situations, norms, issues, or problems. They also enlighten, warn and advise, or teach language in order to change perception which is believed to become reality.

References

External links

PanAfriL10n page on Nupe
Takada nya Aduwa nya Eza Kama kendona zizi nya Anglican Church yi na Portions of the Book of Common Prayer in Nupe (1955) digitized by Richard Mammana

Languages of Nigeria
Nupoid languages
Nupe